Sinhala may refer to:

 Something of or related to the Sinhalese people of Sri Lanka
 Sinhalese people
 Sinhala language, one of the three official languages used in Sri Lanka
 Sinhala script, a writing system for the Sinhala language
 Sinhala (Unicode block), a block of Sinhala characters in Unicode
 Sinhala cinema
 Sinhala Kingdom, the Lankan kingdom mentioned in the Mahābhārata
 "Sinhala", a song from the 1999 album The Magical Sounds of Banco de Gaia

 
Language and nationality disambiguation pages